The Old Post Office is a historic building at 48 Corn Street in Bristol, England.

It was built in 1746 by Samuel Glascodine to complement The Exchange, acting as the central post office for the city of Bristol for over 200 years. It was part rebuilt as a facsimile of the original in 1993 and is now used as an office.

It has been designated by Historic England as a Grade I listed building.

See also
 Grade I listed buildings in Bristol

References

Grade I listed buildings in Bristol
Grade I listed office buildings
Government buildings completed in 1746
Pubs in Bristol
Post office buildings in the United Kingdom